The Aero A.304 was a Czechoslovakian bomber aircraft that first flew in 1937. It had originally been developed as an airliner, the A.204, but when Aero could not find buyers for the design, it was militarised and successfully marketed to the Czechoslovak Air Force. It was also exported to Bulgaria, where it was known as the "Pelikan".

Operators

Bulgarian Air Force – (One unit in service)

Czechoslovakian Air Force

Luftwaffe – (War plunder from Czechoslovak Air Force)

Slovak Air Force (1939–45)

Specifications (A.304)

See also

References

Notes

Bibliography
Green, William. War Planes of the Second World War: Volume Seven Bombers and Reconnaissance Aircraft. London:Macdonald, 1967.

A.304
1930s Czechoslovakian bomber aircraft
Aircraft first flown in 1937
Twin piston-engined tractor aircraft